Macniven and Cameron Ltd., later known as Waverley Cameron Ltd., was a printing and stationery company based in Edinburgh, Scotland. The company was best known for its pen nibs, the "Pickwick", the "Owl", and the "Waverley", which were sold under the advertising doggerel:

History
In 1770, Nisbet MacNiven established a paper-making business at Balerno, outside Edinburgh. The firm soon diversified into stationery and moved to premises on Blair Street in Edinburgh's Old Town.

In the 1840s, brothers John and Donald Cameron became involved, and the firm became Macniven and Cameron.

The "Waverley" nib was invented by Duncan Cameron, another brother, and was unusual in having an upturned point, making the ink flow more smoothly on the paper. The "Waverley" was named after the Waverley novels of Sir Walter Scott (1771–1832), which were still hugely popular at the time. The new nib was initially manufactured by Gillott and others, until the company bought a factory in Bordesley, Birmingham, in 1900. It then manufactured its own nibs, fountain pens and printed stationery, until 1964, when the factory closed.

Macniven and Cameron also made pens called the "Pickwick", "Owl", "Phaeton", "Nile", "Hindoo" and "Commercial". The company filed several patents in relation to its fountain pens.

References

External links

1879 advertisement for Macniven & Cameron Pens
1890 advertisement for Macniven & Cameron Pens

Manufacturing companies established in 1770
Manufacturing companies based in Edinburgh
Pulp and paper companies of the United Kingdom
Defunct pulp and paper companies
Stationers of the United Kingdom
Fountain pen and ink manufacturers
1770 establishments in Scotland
British companies established in 1770